Father of the Bride is a 1991 American romantic comedy film starring Steve Martin, Diane Keaton, Kimberly Williams (in her film debut), George Newbern, Martin Short, BD Wong, and Kieran Culkin. It is a remake of the 1950 film of the same name. Martin portrays George Banks, a businessman and owner of an athletic shoe company (called Side Kicks), who, when he finds out his daughter is getting married, panics.

The film opened to positive reviews, and became a box office success. With its success, a sequel, Father of the Bride Part II, was released in 1995. This was Nancy Meyers and Keaton's second of four films together, the first being Baby Boom (1987); the others were Father of the Bride Part II and Something's Gotta Give (2003).

Plot
George Banks is the owner of a successful athletic shoe company called Side Kicks in San Marino, California. George narrates what he had to go through with his daughter's wedding. His 22-year-old daughter Annie, freshly graduated from college, returns home from Europe and announces that she is engaged to Bryan MacKenzie, despite their only having known each other for three months. The sudden shock turns the warm reunion into a heated argument between George and Annie, but they quickly reconcile in time for Bryan to arrive and meet them. Despite Bryan's good financial status and likeable demeanor, George takes an immediate dislike to him while his wife, Nina, accepts him as a potential son-in-law. George does not want to let go of his daughter.

George and Nina meet Bryan's parents, John and Joanna MacKenzie, who are wealthy and live in a mansion in Bel-Air. John reassures George by also expressing how shocked he had initially been at Bryan's engagement, but George quickly gets into trouble when he begins nosing around the MacKenzies' financial records. He eventually ends up falling into the pool when cornered by the MacKenzies' vicious pet Dobermans.

All is forgiven, however, and the Banks family meets with an eccentric European wedding coordinator, Franck Eggelhoffer. He sneers dismissively at George's complaints about the price of the extravagant wedding items, including a flock of swans. The high price, and the seemingly excessive number of wedding invitations and cost of each dinner, begin to take their toll on George and he becomes slightly insane. The last straw occurs when he retrieves his old tuxedo from the attic—with the expectation that it will still fit—and as he struggles to put it on, it promptly rips when he bends over. He leaves the house to cool off, but ends up causing a disturbance at the supermarket. Fed up with paying for things he doesn't want, he starts removing hot dog buns from the store's 12-bun packets so as to match the 8-dog packets of hot dogs. He ends up getting arrested, but Nina arrives to bail him out of jail on the condition that he stop ruining the wedding.

With help from Nina and Franck, George becomes more relaxed and accepting of the wedding, particularly when Annie and Bryan receive rather expensive gifts from extended family members. The wedding plans are put on hold when they have a fight over a blender Bryan gave her as a gift, which only gets worse when she refuses to believe his story about George's earlier antics. George takes Bryan out for a drink, initially intending to get rid of him for good, but seeing his heartbroken face and genuine claim that he loves Annie, George has a change of heart and finally accepts him. He confesses to Annie that what happened at the MacKenzies' house was true, and she and Bryan reconcile.

Despite some last-minute problems with the weather, the wedding is finally prepared, almost one year after Bryan and Annie's first meeting. They marry and the reception is held at the house, despite a police officer objecting to the number of parked cars in the street. Unfortunately, George misses Annie throwing her bouquet and is unable to see her before she and Bryan leave for their honeymoon in Hawaii. The film picks up George's narration from the beginning as the wedding reception ends. Annie calls him from the airport to thank and tell him that she loves him one last time before they board the plane.

With the house now empty and the wedding finished, George finds solace with Nina and dances with her.

Cast

Production
The remake rights were acquired by Disney from Turner Entertainment. Touchstone Pictures tapped the studio's finance partner, Touchwood Pacific Partners, to fund the production of the film.

Soundtrack
The film's soundtrack was scored by Alan Silvestri and was influenced by jazz and Christmas instrumentations. It contains the following tracks:

 "Main Title"
 "Annie's Theme"
 "Drive to Brunch"
 "Snooping Around"
 "Pool Cue"
 "Annie Asleep"
 "Basketball Kiss"
 "The Wedding"
 "Snow Scene"
 "Nina at the Stairs"
 "The Big Day"
 "Annie at the Mirror
 "Pachelbel Canon"
 "The Way You Look Tonight" - Alan Silvestri, Dorothy Fields
 "My Annie's Gone"
 "The Way You Look Tonight (Reprise)"
 "End Credits"

The following songs are also featured in the film:
 "My Girl" - The Temptations
 "(Today I Met) The Boy I'm Going to Marry" - Darlene Love
 "Chapel of Love" - The Dixie Cups

Reception
Rotten Tomatoes reported that 70% of critics gave Father of the Bride a positive review, based on 44 reviews, with an average rating of 6.00/10. The site's critics consensus reads: "While it doesn't quite hit the heights of the original, this remake of the 1950 classic is pleasantly enjoyable, thanks in large part to winning performances from Steve Martin and Martin Short." At Metacritic the film has a weighted average score of 51 out of 100, based on 17 critics, indicating "mixed or average reviews". Audiences polled by CinemaScore gave the film an average grade of "A−" on an A+ to F scale.

Roger Ebert of the Chicago Sun-Times gave the film three stars out of four and called it "one of the movies with a lot of smiles and laughter in it, and a good feeling all the way through." Desson Howe of The Washington Post praised Martin for his performance in it, writing that "it is so funny, it's almost sublime. The explanation is simple: It's all Steve Martin."

The film drew $15 million on its debut. It grossed $89.3 million in the United States and Canada and $40 million internationally, for a worldwide gross of $129 million.

Awards and nominations
MTV Movie Awards
 1992, nominated, Best Breakthrough Performance - Kimberly Williams
 1992, nominated, Best Comedic Performance - Steve Martin

BMI Film Awards
 1993, won, Best Movie - Father of the Bride

Young Artist Award
 1993, nominated, Best Young Actor Co-starring in a Motion Picture - Kieran Culkin

Remake
On February 21, 2018, The Hollywood Reporter revealed that remakes of several films are in development as exclusive content for The Walt Disney Company's streaming service Disney+ with one of those projects named in the announcement as Father of the Bride.

On September 24, 2020, Warner Bros. announced their plans for a remake starring a Hispanic family, with the script being penned by Matt Lopez. The HBO Max original film was released on June 16, 2022.

References

External links

 
 
 
 

Father of the Bride (franchise)
1991 films
1991 comedy films
American comedy films
American coming-of-age films
Films directed by Charles Shyer
Films with screenplays by Charles Shyer
Remakes of American films
Films based on American novels
Films set in Los Angeles
Films shot in California
Films shot in Los Angeles
Touchstone Pictures films
Films scored by Alan Silvestri
Films about families
Films about weddings in the United States
Midlife crisis films
Films with screenplays by Nancy Meyers
Films about father–daughter relationships
Films about parenting
1990s English-language films
1990s American films